Parliamentary elections were held in Greece on . Eleftherios Venizelos had begun to dominate the political life of the country. He was listed as a candidate by his followers and was elected with the most votes at the Attica-Boeotia constituency. The United Parties won 211 of the 362 seats.
Because Venizelos did not have the confidence of Parliament, he agreed with King George to dissolve parliament. Fresh elections were held in November.

Results

References

Greece
1910 08
1910 in Greece
1910s in Greek politics
History of Greece (1909–1924)
Greece
Legis